The 55th edition of the Vuelta a Colombia was held from July 24 to August 7, 2005.

Stages

2005-07-24: Pitalito — Pitalito (5.7 km)

2005-07-25: Pitalito — Yaguara (226.9 km)

2005-07-26: Neiva — Agua de Dios (198 km)

2005-07-27: Melgar — Armenia (180.4 km)

2005-07-28: Armenia — Cali (185.7 km)

2005-07-29: Cali — Cerrito (41.2 km)

2005-07-30: Palmira — Santa Rosa de Cabal (197.6 km)

2005-07-31: Chinchina — Medellín (202.2 km)

2005-08-01: Medellín — Jerico (113.1 km)

2005-08-02: Jerico — Ciudad Bolívar (124.3 km)

2005-08-03: Ciudad Bolívar — Palestina (188.7 km)

2005-08-04: Chinchina — Mariquita (138.6 km)

2005-08-05: Dorada — Fontibón (175.6 km)

2005-08-06: Bogotá — Bogotá (20.9 km)

2005-08-07: Bogotá Circuito (113 km)

Jersey progression

Final classification

Notes

References 
 cyclingnews
 pedalear

Vuelta a Colombia
Chile
Vuelta Ciclista